A bugbear is a legendary creature, comparable to the Bogeyman.

Bugbear may refer to:

Bugbear Entertainment, a Finnish video game company
Bugbears (album), an album by Darren Hayman